Rex Witte (28 September 1913 – 8 October 2001) was a South African cricketer. He played in five first-class matches from 1933/34 to 1951/52.

References

External links
 

1913 births
2001 deaths
South African cricketers
Border cricketers
Gauteng cricketers
People from Queenstown, South Africa
Cricketers from the Eastern Cape